Yar Zar Nay Win (also spelt Yaza Ne Win, born 1968) is a Burmese film actor and singer. He was one of the most successful leading men of Burmese cinema during the first half of the 2000s.

Ne Win comes from a well known artistic family. He is the son of two-time Myanmar Academy Award winning Kawleikgyin Ne Win, and the elder brother of famous singer Hayma Ne Win and a first cousin of Eindra Kyaw Zin, one of the most successful models and leading ladies of Burmese cinema. His maternal grandfather was Bo Zeya, one of the Thirty Comrades that founded the modern Burmese Army in 1941.

References

1968 births
Living people
Burmese male film actors
21st-century Burmese male singers
People from Yangon
20th-century Burmese male actors
21st-century Burmese male actors